Michał Pruchnik (born 4 July 1991) is a Polish footballer who plays as a forward.

Senior career

Pruchnik's career started with Stal Mielec in 2007 after having moved from the club's youth team. In 2009 he joined Lechia Gdańsk, however after 4 seasons with the club he failed to play for the first team, but had managed 32 games and 11 goals for the Lechia second team. While contracted with Lechia, Pruchnik had two loan spells, firstly with Bałtyk Gdynia before joining Stal Mielec. He rejoined Stal permanently after the loan deal. His time at Stal wasn't as successful as his loan spell, and after a season he had left the club, failing to score a goal. He spent 4 years out of football before returning to play for Piast Tuczempy and Korona Rzeszów in 2018.

References

1991 births
Lechia Gdańsk players
Polish footballers
Association football forwards
Living people